The Committee for Cultural Relations with Foreign Countries (CCRFC) is a North Korean organization tasked with organizing cultural exchange with other countries.

The committee was founded when the North Korean state was declared. It was modeled after its Soviet equivalent, the  All-Union Society for Cultural Relations with Foreign Countries. Initially the organization sought to generate goodwill toward North Korea abroad, but after the North Korean famine it has concentrated on acquiring resources. It seeks hard currency from tourism, cultural diplomacy, and foreign direct investment.

The committee supports the Korean Friendship Association and other friendship societies. The staff of the committee leads a relatively cosmopolitan life with access to foreign travel, people, and goods. Its personnel includes higher-ups in the ruling Workers' Party of Korea and the state security apparatus. The staff arrange business deals with foreigners to evade international trade restrictions and receive a share of the proceeds. Although these deals have had limited success, the committee remains influential as a point of contact for journalists and other foreign visitors, whose guides may be representatives of the committee. Its activities overlap and to some extent compete with those of the Ministry of Foreign Affairs.

The current chairwoman is Kim Jong-suk and vice-chairman So Ho-won. It is based in Pyongyang.

See also
Politics of North Korea
Foreign relations of North Korea
Culture of North Korea
Alejandro Cao de Benós
Ministry of External Economic Relations

References

External links

Foreign relations of North Korea
North Korean culture
Korea friendship associations